Irma is a female given name.

It is also used in combination with other names in the abbreviated form "Irm-," for example, Irmine, Irmela, Irmgard, Irmgardis, and Irmentraud. The name comes from the Old High German "irmin", meaning "world". The Georgian given name "Irma" comes from the Georgian word "iremi"—"deer".

The name days for Irma are February 19 (Germany), March 31 (Finland), April 7 (Sweden), May 3 (Hungary), September 10 (Czech Republic), September 18 (Poland), October 13 (Latvia), October 25 (USA), and November 14 (Slovakia).

People
Irma, Cameroonian singer/songwriter
Irma Baltuttis, German singer
Irma Brandeis, American Dante scholar
Irma Capece Minutolo, Italian opera singer
Irma Flaquer, Guatemalan government critic
Irma Grese, German Nazi SS Holocaust concentration camp supervisor executed for war crimes
Irma Heijting-Schuhmacher, Dutch freestyle swimmer
Irma Huerta, Mexican freestyle swimmer
Irma Khetsuriani, Georgian wheelchair fencer
Irma Kurtz (born 1935), American-born UK-based agony aunt
Irma de Malkhozouny, Serbian ballet dancer 
Irma May, Polish social reformer
Irma McClaurin, American poet and anthropologist
Irma Miranda, Mexican model, TV Host and beauty pageant titleholder who was crowned Mexicana Universal 2022
Irma Nioradze, Georgian ballerina
Irma S. Raker, American lawyer
Irma Poma Canchumani (born 1969), Peruvian artist and environmental defender
Irma Rangel, American politician
Irma S. Rombauer, cookbook author
Irma Sandoval-Ballesteros, Mexican academic
Irma Serrano, Mexican actress
Irma Stern, South African painter
Irma St. Paule, Ukrainian-born American character actress
Irma Theoda Jones, American philanthropist
Irma Thomas, soul singer
Irma Toivanen (1922–2010), Finnish politician and teacher
Irma Voigt (1882–1953), American educator
Irma von Cube, American screenwriter

Fictional characters
Irma (comics), a character from The Adventures of Tintin by Hergé
Irma, the title character of Irma la Douce (1963), a comedy film by Billy Wilder
Irma, the title character of the My Friend Irma television and radio situation comedies and a 1949 film
Irma Barlow, a character in the British soap opera Coronation Street
Irma Bunt, from On Her Majesty’s Secret Service
Irma Gobb, a character from the British sitcom Mr. Bean and its animated series.
Irma Lair, character in W.I.T.C.H. series
Irma Langinstein, in the 1987-1996 Teenage Mutant Ninja Turtles cartoon and Archie TMNT Adventures comics
Irma Leopold, a character from Joan Lindsay's novel Picnic at Hanging Rock 
Irma Pince, librarian in the Harry Potter series
Irma Crabbe, character in the Harry Potter series
Irma the waitress, character in the Garfield comic strip by Jim Davis
Irma Homais, daughter of fictional apothecary, M. Homais, and a minor character in Flaubert's Madame Bovary
Irma Vep, character in the film within a film central to the 1996 French film titled Irma Vep
'Irma', lieutenant of Colony Mu who is also the Consul I, in Xenoblade Chronicles 3
 Irma Steiner, a character of the anime and manga Edens Zero and the mother of Weisz Steiner

Other uses
Hurricane Irma, 2017
Hamilton women's watch Irma, 1952

See also
Irma (disambiguation)
Erma (disambiguation)

References

External links
Behind the Name

Feminine given names
German feminine given names
Italian feminine given names